Amila Mendis (born 9 June 1982) is a Sri Lankan former cricketer. He played in 61 first-class and 48 List A matches between 1998/99 and 2013/14. He made his Twenty20 debut on 17 August 2004, for Sri Lanka Police Sports Club in the 2004 SLC Twenty20 Tournament.

References

External links
 

1982 births
Living people
Sri Lankan cricketers
Bloomfield Cricket and Athletic Club cricketers
Matara Sports Club cricketers
Sri Lanka Police Sports Club cricketers
Place of birth missing (living people)